Pentti Airikkala (4 September 1945 – 30 September 2009) was one of the "Flying Finns" who dominated world rallying in the past four decades. His career was more sporadic than many of his contemporaries, and he competed in only three World Rally Championship (WRC) events regularly; the two Scandinavian rallies (the 1000 Lakes and the Swedish Rally) and the RAC Rally in the United Kingdom.

Airikkala was born in Helsinki, Finland. Most of his top flight competitive experience was behind the wheel of various rear wheel drive Vauxhall/Opels like the Chevette HS and Magnum coupé, but his greatest success came in the twilight of his career, when he won the 1989 RAC Rally in a Group A Mitsubishi Galant VR-4. He is still the third oldest driver to win a WRC event.

Altogether he competed in 36 WRC events between 1973 and 1990, and a 37th in 2003, scoring 102 points and achieving a best of 9th overall in the 1981 Drivers' Championship. He also contested the British Rally Championship in the 1970s/80s, becoming British Rally Champion in 1979. Since retiring from full-time international competition he operated a highly successful rally driving school in Oxfordshire teaching left-foot braking, where his roster of pupils included subsequent World Champions Colin McRae and Richard Burns.

Death
Airikkala died at Bray, Berkshire, UK, aged 64. He had been battling illness in recent years and was admitted to hospital shortly before his death after suffering liver problems and a fall.

WRC victories

Complete WRC results

References

External links
Pentti Airikkala's UK-based rally driving school
Profile of Airikkala at World Rally Archive
Profile of Airikkala at Rallybase
Memorial page 

1945 births
2009 deaths
Deaths from liver disease
Finnish expatriates in the United Kingdom
World Rally Championship drivers
Finnish rally drivers
People from Bray, Berkshire
Sportspeople from Helsinki
Nismo drivers